Hyperostosis is an excessive growth of bone. It may lead to exostosis. It occurs in many musculoskeletal disorders.

See also
 Diffuse idiopathic skeletal hyperostosis
 Hyperostosis frontalis interna
 Infantile cortical hyperostosis
 Porotic hyperostosis
 SAPHO syndrome

References

External links 

Gross pathology
Osteopathies